Lee Jong-Min (born March 8, 1982) is a  South Korean former swimmer, who specialized in backstroke events. Lee competed only in the men's 200 m backstroke at the 2000 Summer Olympics in Sydney. He posted a FINA B-standard entry time of 2:05.44 from the Dong-A Swimming Tournament in Ulsan. He challenged seven other swimmers in heat two, including Cuba's Olympic bronze medalist Neisser Bent. Because only a single swimmer scratched from his heat, Lee closed out the field to last place by a 2.09-second deficit behind winner Bent in 2:07.14. Lee failed to advance into the semifinals, as he placed thirty-ninth overall in the prelims.

References

1982 births
Living people
South Korean male backstroke swimmers
Olympic swimmers of South Korea
Swimmers at the 2000 Summer Olympics
Swimmers from Seoul